Mauldin is a city in Greenville County, South Carolina, United States. The population was 24,724 at the 2020 census. It is a principal city of the Greenville-Anderson-Mauldin Metropolitan Statistical Area.

Geography

Mauldin is located south of the center of Greenville County, between the city of Greenville to the northwest and Simpsonville to the southeast.

U.S. Route 276 (Main Street) passes through the center of Mauldin, leading northwest  to the center of Greenville and southeast  to Simpsonville. Interstate 385 runs through the eastern side of Mauldin, leading north to Interstate 85 on the east side of Greenville. I-385 connects with Interstate 185 on the southern edge of Mauldin, and I-185 continues west and northwest  to join I-85 on the southwest side of Greenville. From its interchange with I-185, I-385 leads southeast  to Interstate 26 near Clinton.

History
Benjamin Griffith was awarded the first land grant in what is now called Mauldin in 1784. The name of Mauldin was given to the town almost accidentally in 1820 thanks to South Carolina's lieutenant governor, W. L. Mauldin. The train station was called "Mauldin" because the lieutenant governor had assisted in getting the Greenville and Laurens Railroad to come through the village. Over time, the entire area took the name of Mauldin.

During the Civil War, many of Mauldin's citizens left to fight, and the city virtually dried up. It never completely recovered until after World War II when the community was incorporated as a town (1960).

Demographics

2020 census

As of the 2020 United States census, there were 24,724 people, 9,968 households, and 6,339 families residing in the city.

2000 census
As of the census of 2000, there were 15,224 people, 6,131 households, and 4,242 families residing in the city. The population density was 1,767.1 people per square mile (681.9/km2). There were 6,500 housing units at an average density of 754.5 per square mile (291.1/km2). The racial makeup of the city was 74.25% White, 20.82% African American, 0.30% Native American, 2.24% Asian, 0.11% Pacific Islander, 0.98% from other races, and 1.31% from two or more races. Hispanic or Latino of any race were 2.73% of the population.

There were 6,131 households, out of which 33.9% had children under the age of 18 living with them, 55.8% were married couples living together, 10.4% had a female householder with no husband present and 30.8% were non-families. 26.0% of all households were made up of individuals, and 6.2% had someone living alone who was 65 years of age or older. The average household size was 2.46 and the average family size was 2.97.

In the city, the population was spread out, with 25.0% under the age of 18, 8.1% from 18 to 24, 33.5% from 25 to 44, 24.1% from 45 to 64, and 9.3% who were 65 years of age or older. The median age was 35 years. For every 100 females, there were 93.2 males. For every 100 females age 18 and over, there were 91.0 males.

The median income for a household in the city was $51,657, and the median income for a family was $61,817. Males had a median income of $41,047 versus $29,985 for females. The per capita income for the city was $24,750. About 3.2% of families and 4.4% of the population were below the poverty line, including 6.7% of those under age 18 and 9.2% of those age 65 or over.

Economy
The supermarket chain BI-LO was founded in Mauldin and had its headquarters there until 2011.

Education
Public education in Mauldin is administered by Greenville County School District. The district operates Mauldin High School.

Mauldin has a public library, a branch of the Greenville County Library System.

Notable people
Kevin Garnett, Olympian, professional basketball player
Orlando Jones, actor
Al Yeargin, professional baseball player

See also 
 List of municipalities in South Carolina

References

External links

 
 

Cities in South Carolina
Cities in Greenville County, South Carolina
Upstate South Carolina
Populated places established in 1820
1820 establishments in South Carolina